NGC 2276  is an intermediate spiral galaxy in the constellation Cepheus. The galaxy lies 120 million light-years away from Earth. NGC 2276 has an asymmetrical appearance, most likely caused by gravitational interactions with its neighbor, elliptical galaxy NGC 2300. One of the many starburst spiral arms contains an intermediate mass black hole with 50,000 times the mass of the Sun, named NGC 2276-3c. NGC 2276-3c has produced two jets: a large-scale radio jet, approximately 2,000 light years long, and an "inner jet" about 6 light years long. The galaxy shows an enhanced rate of star formation that may have been triggered by a collision with a dwarf galaxy, or by the gravitational interaction with its neighbor compressing gas and dust.

It was discovered by Friedrich August Theodor Winnecke in 1876. In the Atlas of Peculiar Galaxies, the galaxy is mentioned twice, once as Arp 25, in the category spiral galaxies with one heavy arm, and one more time as Arp 114, in the category elliptical galaxies close to and perturbing spiral galaxies, in pair with NGC 2300.

NGC 2276 has been home to six supernovae in the last 60 years.

Gallery

References

External links 

 Supernova SN 2016gfy in NGC 2276  from The Virtual Telescope Project

Cepheus (constellation)
Intermediate spiral galaxies
2276
03740
21039
025
Interacting galaxies